Popstar Diaries is a Philippine television show on Viva TV with a slogan "It's the Pop Princess uncovered". Originally, it is a program shown at Pinoy Box Office channel from 2009 to 2019.

Overview
The show focuses on the professional life of Philippines Popstar Royalty Sarah Geronimo.

Popstar Diaries airs every Saturday at 9 p.m., with encore every Monday at 3 p.m., Wednesdays at 7 p.m. and Fridays at 9 a.m. on Pinoy Box Office channel.

The show debuted on July 16, 2012 on Viva TV when Viva Television revived Viva TV on the air. After a 9 years hiatus, the channel was relaunched as the new 24 hour all-Filipino general Entertainment channel on Cable and Satellite, along with the launch of new programming except Popstar Diaries which is the only Viva produced program since 2009 from Pinoy Box Office channel.

Episodes
The 30-minutes show captures behind the scenes, showbiz engagements - from photo shoots, studio recording, rehearsals, mall tours, TV guesting and movie events.

Cast

Main cast
 Sarah Geronimo

Special Participation
 Mark Bautista
 Various Viva Records artists
 G-Force Dance Company
 Various colleagues in the industry

Theme song
The theme song used on the show is Sarah Geronimo's various song recordings or singles in an album.

See also
 Viva TV

References

Sarah Geronimo
Philippine reality television series
2009 Philippine television series debuts
2019 Philippine television series endings
Television series by Viva Television
Filipino-language television shows